Vaucresson is a commune in the western suburbs of Paris, France. It is in the Hauts-de-Seine department  from the center of Paris.

Vaucresson contains abundant parkland; 22 of its 308 hectares are classed as natural zones. Today Vaucresson is principally a wealthy residential community, and has the ninth-highest household income of any commune in France.

Population
The people who live in the commune are called Vaucressonais in French.

Culture
Vaucresson has a movie theatre called "Cinema Normandie". There is also a cultural centre, "La Montgolfiere", which offers many activities and cultural exhibits. The name was given as a reminder of the first hot air balloon which set off from the Chateau de Versailles the 19 September 1783 and landed in Vaucresson, carrying a duck, a rooster and a lamb.

Transport
Vaucresson is served by Vaucresson station on the Transilien Line L suburban rail line.

Education
Public schools:
 Two preschools: Ecole maternelle des Grandes-Fermes and Ecole maternelle des Peupliers
 Two elementary schools: Ecole élémentaire du Coteau and Ecole élémentaire des Peupliers
 Collège public Yves-du-Manoir
Lycée Alexandre Dumas in nearby Saint-Cloud serves students from Vaucresson.

Special schools:
 Groupe Scolaire Toulouse-Lautrec (junior and senior high school)

Private schools:
 Cours Suger privé (junior and senior high school)

Personalities
 Jean Ferrat, author, poet and singer, was born here in 1930.
 Yves du Manoir, French rugby player, born here in 1904

See also
Communes of the Hauts-de-Seine department

References

External links

Official site (in French)

Communes of Hauts-de-Seine